Villers-les-Pots is a commune in the Côte-d'Or department in eastern France.

Population

Transportation
The commune has a railway station, on the Dijon–Vallorbe line.

See also
Communes of the Côte-d'Or department

References

Communes of Côte-d'Or